We Got It Made is an American sitcom television series that aired on NBC from September 8, 1983, to March 10, 1984, and in first-run syndication from September 11, 1987, to March 30, 1988. It starred Teri Copley as a young woman who works as a maid for two bachelors in New York City, played by Matt McCoy (replaced by John Hillner for the syndicated version) and Tom Villard. The series was created by Gordon Farr and Lynne Farr Brao (credited as simply Lynne Farr during the 1987–88 season).  The executive producer was Fred Silverman.

Synopsis

1983 NBC version
The show focuses on Mickey Mackenzie (Teri Copley), a girl in her early 20s who applies for a housekeeping job in Manhattan. Her employers are two bachelors who share the two-bedroom apartment—conservative attorney David Tucker (Matt McCoy) and goofy, idealistic salesman Jay Bostwick (Tom Villard). Mickey is the first — and only — applicant for the job; in fact, both David and Jay are so taken by her beauty, they immediately hire her.

Both David and Jay had girlfriends—David's was attorney Claudia Jones (Stepfanie Kramer, who left after episode #19 and found far greater fame on the NBC crime drama Hunter - Copley and Villard would also later appear as guest stars), while Jay dated kindergarten teacher Beth Sorensen (Bonnie Urseth). Both Claudia and Beth were skeptical about their boyfriends having such an attractive maid living with them, but they eventually grew to accept Mickey as a friend.

When it first premiered, We Got It Made looked to be successful, winning its time slot early in the run. Before long, though, negative reviews from both critics and the general viewing public eroded its viewership. NBC moved the series from its original Thursday night berth to Saturdays in January 1984. The change in its night and time did little in keeping the series on the air; in March 1984, We Got It Made was cancelled.

1987 syndicated version
We Got It Made was revived in first-run syndication for the 1987–1988 season as part of NBC's "Prime Time Begins at 7:30" campaign, in which the network's owned-and-operated stations ran first-run sitcoms in the 7:30–8:00 pm ET/PT (6:30–7:00 pm CT) time slot to counterprogram competing stations' game shows, sitcom reruns, and other offerings. However, the series was picked up by non-NBC stations, as well.

Teri Copley and Tom Villard were the only returning cast members, Jay and Beth no longer were a couple (Bonnie Urseth had decided not to participate this time), and David was now played by John Hillner. David, Jay, and Mickey had new neighbors, as well—policeman Max Papavasiolios Sr. (Ron Karabatsos) and his son, Max Jr. (Lance Wilson-White). Mickey seemed to allow greater physical attention—and affection—from the now-single Jay and David, but at the same time, she doted on them as if they were her young sons. She also had a special relationship with teenaged Max, who frequently came to her for advice in attracting and dealing with women, although he would have preferred putting that advice to use on Mickey alone.

As they had with the NBC version, critics lambasted the series, and We Got It Made lasted only one season in syndication. The series' final original episode was released on March 30, 1988, with reruns airing until the week of September 3, 1988, in most markets.

Cast

Teri Copley as Mickey Mackenzie
Tom Villard as Jay Bostwick
Matt McCoy as David Tucker (1983–1984)
Bonnie Urseth as Beth Sorensen (1983–1984)
Stepfanie Kramer as Claudia Jones (1983–1984)
John Hillner as David Tucker (1987–1988)
Ron Karabatsos as Max Papavasilios Sr. (1987–1988)
Lance Wilson-White as Max Papavasilios, Jr. (1987–1988)

Notable guest stars included Elaine Joyce (as Mickey's mother), Edie McClurg, Julie Brown, Scatman Crothers, Alice Ghostley, Richard Paul, Billie Bird, Joel Brooks, Jack Bannon, Peggy Pope, and Jean Kasem.

NBC ratings

Syndicated stations (1987-88)

Episode list

Season 1: 1983–84

Season 2: 1987–88

See also
 List of programs broadcast by NBC

References

External links

We Got It Made at Nostalgia Central

1980s American sitcoms
1983 American television series debuts
1984 American television series endings
1987 American television series debuts
1988 American television series endings
English-language television shows
First-run syndicated television programs in the United States
NBC original programming
Television series by MGM Television
Television shows set in New York City
American television series revived after cancellation